Olivia is an unincorporated community centered in the Barbecue Township of Harnett County, North Carolina, United States, but also covering parts of Anderson Creek Township near the Lee County line. It is a part of the Dunn Micropolitan Area, which is also a part of the greater Raleigh–Durham–Cary Combined Statistical Area (CSA) as defined by the United States Census Bureau.

History
Olivia was originally named "Rock Branch" and was founded circa 1865 but the name was changed in 1913 to honor W.J. Olive, who introduced Flue-cured tobacco to the community .

Demographics
Olivia's Zip Code Tabulation Area (Zip Code 28368) has a population of about 443 as of the 2000 census.  The population is 50.6% male and 49.4% female.  About 83.1% of the population is white, 11.1% African-American, 5.8% Hispanic, 0.9% Asian, and 2.8% of other races.  1.8% of people are two or more races and there are no American Indians.

The median household income is $20,500 with 31.3% of the population living below the poverty line.

Notable person
 Herb Thomas - NASCAR champion

References
 

Unincorporated communities in Harnett County, North Carolina
Unincorporated communities in North Carolina
Populated places established in 1865